This article lists the main target shooting events and their results for 2022.

World Events

International Shooting Sport Federation

ISSF World Shooting Championships
 October 12-27: 2022 ISSF World Shooting Championships held in Egypt.
 September 19 - October 12: 2022 World Shotgun Championships held in Osijek, Croatia
 August 2-9: 2022 World Running Target Championships held at the Centre National de Tir in Châteauroux, France

ISSF World Cup
 2022 ISSF World Cup

World Shooting Para Sport Championships
 November 6-17: 2022 World Shooting Para Sport Championships held in Al Ain, United Arab Emirates

International Practical Shooting Confederation
 November 27 - December 3: 2022 IPSC Handgun World Shoot held in Pattaya, Thailand,

FITASC
 2022 Results

2021 Islamic Solidarity Games
 August 10-15: Shooting at the 2021 Islamic Solidarity Games held in Konya, Turkey. This event was postponed from 2021 due to COVID-19.

Regional Events

Africa

Americas

Bolivarian Games
 June 27 - July 3: Shooting at the 2022 Bolivarian Games held in Valledupar, Colombia

South American Games
 October 9-14: Shooting at the 2022 South American Games held in Asunción, Paraguay.

Asia

Asian Shooting Championships
 November 9 - 19: 2022 Asian Airgun Championships held in Daegu, South Korea

Southeast Asian Games
 May 16-22: Shooting at the 2021 Southeast Asian Games held in Hanoi, Vietnam

Europe

European Shooting Confederation
 March 18-27: 2022 European 10 m Events Championships held in Hamar, Norway.
 July 25-30: 2022 European 300 m Rifle Championships in Zagreb, Croatia.
 August 24 - September 12: 2022 European Shotgun Championships in Larnaca, Cyprus.
 September 5-8: 2022 European 25/50 m Events Championships held in Wrocław, Poland.

Mediterranean Games
 June 28 - July 3: Shooting at the 2022 Mediterranean Games held in Hassi Ben Okba, Algeria

"B Matches"
 December 8-12: RIAC held in Strassen, Luxembourg

National Events

United Kingdom

NRA Imperial Meeting
 July, held at the National Shooting Centre, Bisley
 Queen's Prize winner: 
 Grand Aggregate winner: 
 Ashburton Shield winners: Bradfield College
 Kolapore Winners: 
 National Trophy Winners: 
 Vizianagram winners: House of Commons

NSRA National Meeting
 August, held at the National Shooting Centre, Bisley
 Earl Roberts British Prone Champion:

USA
 2022 NCAA Rifle Championships, won by Kentucky Wildcats

References

 
2022 in sports
2022 sport-related lists
2020s in shooting sports